Lucia Caporaso is an Italian mathematician, holding a professorship in mathematics at Roma Tre University. She was born in Rome, Italy, on May 22,1965. Her research includes work in algebraic geometry, arithmetic geometry, tropical geometry and enumerative geometry.

Education and career
Caporaso earned a laurea from Sapienza University of Rome in 1989. She completed her Ph.D. at Harvard University in 1993. Her dissertation, On a Compactification of the Universal Picard Variety over the Moduli Space of Stable Curves, was supervised by Joe Harris.

She became a Benjamin Pierce Assistant Professor of Mathematics at Harvard, a researcher at the University of Rome Tor Vergata, an assistant professor at the Massachusetts Institute of Technology, and an associate professor at the University of Sannio, before moving to Roma Tre as a professor in 2001. From 2013 to 2018, she has headed the Department of Mathematics and Physics at Roma Tre.

Recognition
Caporaso was the 1997 winner of the Bartolozzi Prize.

She is an invited speaker at the 2018 International Congress of Mathematicians, speaking in the section on algebraic and complex geometry.

References

External links
Home page

Year of birth missing (living people)
Living people
Italian mathematicians
Women mathematicians
Sapienza University of Rome alumni
Harvard University alumni
Harvard University faculty
Massachusetts Institute of Technology faculty